Roderick Findlay McLean (22 October 1915 – 14 September 1979) was an Australian rules footballer who played with Carlton in the VFL. He is the father of Richmond and Carlton footballer Ricky McLean.

A ruckman, McLean was a premiership player with Carlton in 1938 and 1945. Late in the 1942 season he was found guilty of disputing the decisions of a field umpire, abusive language and unseemly conduct during a game which resulted in a 16 games suspension.

McLean served in the Australian Army for three years during World War II.

References

External links

Blueseum profile

1915 births
Australian rules footballers from Melbourne
Carlton Football Club players
Carlton Football Club Premiership players
1979 deaths
Two-time VFL/AFL Premiership players
People from Campbellfield, Victoria
Australian military personnel of World War II
Military personnel from Melbourne